An All-American team is an honorary sports team composed of the best amateur players of a specific season for each position—who in turn are given the honorific "All-America" and typically referred to as "All-American athletes", or simply "All-Americans".  Although the honorees generally do not compete as a unit, the term is used in U.S. team sports to refer to players who are selected by members of the national media.  Walter Camp selected the first All-America team in the early days of American football in 1889.  In 1950, the American Baseball Coaches Association (ABCA) selected its first All-American baseball team.  It has since chosen All-American teams and a player of the year for each division (National Collegiate Athletic Association (NCAA) Division I, Division II, Division III, National Association of Intercollegiate Athletics, junior college, and high school).  Collegiate Baseball selects All-American, Freshman All-American, and High School All-American teams.  Baseball America magazine selects pre-season and post-season All-American teams and College Player of the Year honorees.

Various organizations selected All-American lists of the best players for the 1994 NCAA Division I college baseball season. The ABCA, the magazine Baseball America, and Collegiate Baseball were the NCAA-sanctioned selectors.  This list only includes players selected to the post-season All-American first team for each selector.  However, many All-American selections choose second, third, etc. teams from the remaining eligible candidates.

Accomplishments

The 1994 College Baseball All-America Team included the most highly regarded college baseball players as recognized by various national selectors and its members accumulated numerous collegiate awards. With Nomar Garciaparra, Jason Varitek, and Danny Graves, the team included three future Major League Baseball (MLB) All-Stars. The following is a summary of the collegiate and MLB accomplishments of the players from the team.  However, R. A. Dickey remains an active MLB player. Five players were selected by all three NCAA-sanctioned selectors: pitcher Danny Graves; catcher Varitek; first baseman Tommy Davis; shortstop Garciaparra; and outfielder Payton. Varitek and Todd Walker had both been selected unanimously to the 1993 College Baseball All-America Team, while Antone Williamson is a repeat All-American according to Baseball America.  Veritek had also been a unanimous selection to the 1992 College Baseball All-America Team.  José Cruz Jr. would repeat as a selection to the 1995 College Baseball All-America Team by all selectors and Shane Monahan would repeat as a selection by Collegiate Baseball. Walker won the 1993 College World Series Most Outstanding Player. Varitek swept the Dick Howser Trophy, the Rotary Smith Award, and the Golden Spikes Awards in 1994.

Garciaparra is a two-time American League (AL) batting champion, AL Rookie of the Year, six-time All-Star, who led the AL in at bats, hits, doubles, triples, and intentional walks. He led the AL in errors regardless of position in 2002 and in putouts as a shortstop in 1997. Varitek is a three-time All-Star (2003, 2005 and 2008), Gold Glove-winner, Silver Slugger-winner, and two-time World Series champion (2004 and 2007). He called the pitches for a major league record four no-hitters. Danny Graves, who is a two-time All-Star (2000 and 2004) and won the 2002 Lou Gehrig Memorial Award, is the only Vietnamese-born player in MLB history. Georgia Tech had three selections and Clemson had two.

Several other players made notable marks as professional players.  Paul Wilson became the MLB number one overall draft pick in 1994. Walker led the NL second basemen in fielding percentage and putouts during the 2002 season. Cruz, who won a Gold Glove in 2003 in the NL, led the NL in putouts as a rightfielder (2003) and the AL in putouts as a centerfielder (2000) but also led the AL in errors committed as a rightfielder (2004).  He accumulated over 1,100 hits and 200 home runs.  Payton led the AL outfielders in fielding percentage in both 2005 and 2008 with perfect ratings.  He led the NL in putouts as a leftfielder in 2003 and in assists as a centerfielder in 2004, but he also led the NL in errors as a centerfielder in 2000.

Key

All-Americans
Below are the Division I players selected to the various NCAA-sanctioned lists. The default list order is arranged by the position numbers used by official baseball scorekeepers (i.e., etc.).

See also
U.S. college baseball awards

References
General

Inline citations

College Baseball All-America Teams
All-America